Luciano Lama (14 October 1921 – 31 May 1996) was an Italian trade unionist and politician, General Secretary of Italian General Confederation of Labour from 1970 to 1986.

Biography

Role in the resistance 
Lama graduated in Political Sciences at the University of Florence under the name of Boris Alberti, since he had to remain anonymous because he refused to join the Republic of Salò. When he was very young, Lama joined the Italian Socialist Party and took part in the resistance movement, contributing to free the city of Forlì from the Nazis.

Deputy and secretary of the CGIL 
In 1946, Lama joined the Italian Communist Party, with which he was elected to the Chamber of Deputies in 1958, in 1963 and in 1968. He left his seat when he joined the Italian General Confederation of Labour, being elected Secretary-general of the trade union in 1970.

On 17 February 1977, Lama was violently contested at the University of Rome by a group of young people, who adhered to extra-parliamentary positions.

In January 1978, in an assembly at the EUR in Rome, Lama proposed to the workers a politics of sacrifice, aimed at healing the Italian economy. At the end of his secretary, in 1986, the CGIL was strengthened in terms of political influence as it became the main point of reference for most of the employees.

Senator 
In 1987, Lama was elected with the Communist Party to the Senate and was re-elected in 1992 with the Democratic Party of the Left. From 9 July 1987 to 14 April 1994, Lama was appointed Vice-president of the Senate.

Mayor experience and death 
In 1988, Lama was elected Mayor of Amelia, a town in the province of Terni, and was re-elected in 1994, when he became the first Mayor elected directly by the people of Amelia, receiving support by the whole Alliance of Progressives.

Lama died in office on 31 May 1996, at the age of 74, after a long illness. He is now buried in the Verano Cemetery.

References

External links 
Files about his parliamentary activities (in Italian): III, IV, V, X, XI legislature

1921 births
1996 deaths
Italian Socialist Party politicians
Italian Communist Party politicians
Italian trade unionists
Democratic Party of the Left politicians
20th-century Italian politicians
People from Gambettola